Morionidius is a genus of beetles in the family Carabidae, containing the following species:

 Morionidius charon Andrewes, 1921
 Morionidius doriae Chaudoir, 1880
 Morionidius erebus Alluaud, 1933
 Morionidius inexpectatus Sciaky & Banes, 1997
 Morionidius insularis Kasahara & Ohtani, 1992

References

Pterostichinae